Jastrzębie  is a village in the administrative district of Gmina Rudnik, within Racibórz County, Silesian Voivodeship, in southern Poland.

The village has a population of 170.

Gallery

References

Villages in Racibórz County